José Ángel Córdoba Chambers (born 3 June 2001) is a Panamanian professional footballer who plays as a defender for Bulgarian club Levski Sofia.

Club career
Córdoba started in the youth ranks and began his professional football career at Independiente de La Chorrera. In 2020 he was transferred to Spanish club Celta Vigo but didn't manage to breakthrough in the senior team and made appearances mainly with the reserve team. In the summer of 2020 he was released from the club and several months later he went on a trial with Bulgarian side Etar Veliko Tarnovo. Córdoba had a second trial with Etar before head coach Aleksandar Tomash decided to sign him on a permanent contract. Córdoba made ten appearances in the Bulgarian First League during the second half of the 2020–21 season. The club however got relegated, but Córdoba decided to stay with Etar in the Second League and appeared in eight more games before being loaned to Levski Sofia for one year with option to buy in September 2021. On 5 April 2022, he signed with Levski on a permanent deal until 2025, coming into effect on 1 July 2022.

International career
In March 2022 Cordoba got his first call-up for the national team of Panama for the 2022 FIFA World Cup qualification matches against Honduras, USA and Canada. He made his debut in the final qualifier of the campaign against Canada playing full 90 minutes in a 1–0 win.

Honours

Club
Levski Sofia
 Bulgarian Cup (1): 2021–22

References

External links
Player Profile at lapreferente.com

2001 births
Living people
Panamanian footballers
Panama international footballers
Association football defenders
Panamanian expatriate footballers
Panamanian expatriate sportspeople in Spain
Expatriate footballers in Spain
Panamanian expatriate sportspeople in Bulgaria
Expatriate footballers in Bulgaria
C.A. Independiente de La Chorrera players
Celta de Vigo B players
FC Etar Veliko Tarnovo players
PFC Levski Sofia players
Liga Panameña de Fútbol
First Professional Football League (Bulgaria) players
Second Professional Football League (Bulgaria) players